The ONDAR Show is a French sketch comedy television programme. It was broadcast on France 2 from October 2012 to January 2013, and featured comedians from On n'demande qu'à en rire performing sketches in a format based on American entertainment. It was cancelled after 13 episodes because of low viewing figures.

References

2010s French television series
2012 French television series debuts
2013 French television series endings
French television sketch shows
France Télévisions television comedy